The Cenotaph in the southern New Zealand city of Dunedin stands in the centre of Queen's Gardens, close to the city centre. It is the city's main war memorial.

Location and dedication
The cenotaph stands in Queen's Gardens, an open park lying between The Exchange and the Toitū Otago Settlers Museum. Dunedin's renovated Warehouse Precinct lies immediately to the south. One-way streets which form part of SH 1 flank the gardens on its east and west boundaries.

The monument commemorates Dunedin members of New Zealand's armed forces who perished in the First and Second World Wars. A separate standing plaque (formerly situated close to Dunedin Railway Station in Anzac Square) stands close to the cenotaph and lists the names of all of New Zealand's Victoria Cross recipients. Several of the trees surrounding the perimeter of Queen's Gardens were planted to remember various war anniversaries, and are accompanied by plaques commemorating these events, and a section of the Toitū Otago Settlers Museum dedicated to New Zealand's participation in the two world wars is also located nearby.

Construction
The monument's design was chosen from 63 entries in a public competition. The winning entry was designed by Aucklander William Gummer (of the firm of Gummer and Ford), who also designed several other memorials, most notably the Bridge of Remembrance in Christchurch.

From the central column, a sacrificial urn and four crosses emerge, representing sacrifice. These, along with a relief frieze on the base featuring a lion, torches, laurel wreathes, and fasces, were designed by sculptor Richard Oliver Gross. The original intention was for a bronze frieze to surround the base, but a funding shortfall forced this to be abandoned.

The foundation stone was laid by Dunedin mayor Harold Livingstone Tapley in 1924. Several historic documents were placed in a capsule under the stone, including histories of the military in Otago and copies of current newspapers. The finished memorial was unveiled on 17 March 1927 by Prince Albert, Duke of York (later King George VI) in a ceremony attended by 1,000 relatives of the fallen and 800 returned servicemen, along with many members of the general public. Initially known as "The Citizens' Memorial", it rapidly became known as The Cenotaph (echoing the name of Sir Edwin Lutyens' monument in Whitehall, London) despite not being of the classic "empty tomb" design normally used for structures of this name. A plaque commemorating the fallen of World War Two was added to the memorial at the conclusion of that conflict.

Use and recent history
The cenotaph is the regular venue of Dunedin's Anzac Day commemorations, which often attract several thousand members of the public. On 25 April 2015, the centennial commemoration of Anzac Day, a record crowd estimated at close to 20,000 people attended the dawn commemoration service at the cenotaph.

The cenotaph has a Heritage New Zealand Category II classification. In the wake of the February 2011 Christchurch earthquake, seismic assessments have been made of many New Zealand buildings and monuments. Assessment of the cenotaph has recommended several measures to strengthen the memorial's structure, and the Dunedin City Council plans to accompany these measures with an assessment of other possible improvements to the Queen's Gardens area.

References

External links

Cenotaph
World War I memorials in New Zealand
World War II memorials in New Zealand
1927 sculptures
1927 in New Zealand
1920s architecture in New Zealand
Heritage New Zealand Category 2 historic places in Otago
Cenotaphs in New Zealand
Gummer and Ford buildings and structures
Central Dunedin